José Antonio Vega Órdenes (born 2 November 1982), known as Antonio Vega, is a Chilean former professional footballer who played as a midfielder for clubs in Chile and Asia.

Career
Born in Santiago, Chile, Vega played in his country of birth for Cobreloa, Corporación Municipal Ñuñoa and Palestino.

In 2007 he moved to Malaysia and joined Kuala Muda Naza, winning the 2007–08 Malaysia Premier League. In 2009 he played for Pro Duta in Indonesia.

Next he moved to Thailand and played for BEC Tero Sasana, Lopburi City, Ayutthaya FC, Grakcu Looktabfah and Tak City.

In 2017, as a player of Karketu Dili in Timor-Leste, he won both the Liga Futebol Amadora and the LFA Super Taça, with his compatriot Simón Elissetche as coach. In 2018, he joined Boavista FC.

Personal life
Vega made his home in Indonesia, the country of birth of his wife.

Honours
Kuala Muda Naza
 Malaysia Premier League: 2007–08

Ayutthaya FC
 Regional League Division 2: 2012
 Regional League Central-East Division: 2012

Karketu Dili
 LFA Primeira Divisão: 2017
 LFA Super Taça: 2017

References

External links
 Antonio Vega at playmakerstats.com (English version of ceroacero.es)
 

1982 births
Living people
Footballers from Santiago
Chilean footballers
Chilean expatriate footballers
Cobreloa footballers
Club Deportivo Palestino footballers
Kuala Muda Naza F.C. players
Pro Duta FC players
Antonio Vega
Antonio Vega
Chilean Primera División players
Tercera División de Chile players
Malaysia Premier League players
Antonio Vega
Antonio Vega
Antonio Vega
Chilean expatriate sportspeople in Malaysia
Chilean expatriate sportspeople in Indonesia
Chilean expatriate sportspeople in Thailand
Chilean expatriate sportspeople in East Timor
Expatriate footballers in Malaysia
Expatriate footballers in Indonesia
Expatriate footballers in Thailand
Expatriate footballers in East Timor
Association football midfielders